The Colorado State Rams men's basketball team represents Colorado State University, located in Fort Collins, in the U.S. state of Colorado, in NCAA Division I basketball competition. They play their home games at the Moby Arena and are members of the Mountain West Conference. They are led by head coach Niko Medved.

History
The men's basketball team at Colorado State University—then called Colorado Agricultural College—began competing in the 1901–02 season. The school became a member of the Rocky Mountain Athletic Conference in the 1910–11 season, and followed most of the larger schools in that conference into the Mountain States Conference in the 1938–39 season and stayed in the conference until 1961–62. Colorado State then joined the Western Athletic Conference (WAC) in 1969–70. After 20 seasons in the WAC, Colorado State moved to its current MWC in 1999–00. Colorado State was an inaugural member of the MWC.

Postseason

NCAA tournament results
The Rams have appeared in eleven NCAA Tournaments, with a combined record of 4–12.

NIT results
The Rams have appeared in ten National Invitation Tournaments (NIT), with a combined record of 9–11.

CBI results
The Rams have appeared in one College Basketball Invitational (CBI) and lost the opener.

Notable games
March 13, 1969, in the "Sweet 16" round of the NCAA tournament: Colorado State beat in-state rival and AP #18 Colorado 64–56.
January 19, 1984, at Moby Arena: Colorado State beat AP  #5 UTEP 63–51.
December 29, 1989, at McNichols Sports Arena: Colorado State beat AP #24 North Carolina 78–67 in the Mile High Classic, a four-team tournament in Denver also featuring Colorado and Massachusetts. Colorado State beat Massachusetts the next night to win the tournament.
December 22, 1999, at the Cannon Activities Center at Laie, Hawaii: In a Pearl Harbor Classic tournament game, Colorado State upset AP #18 UCLA 55–54. John Ford made a free throw with 23 seconds left that turned out to be the winning margin.
December 30, 2003, at Moby Arena: Colorado State hosted AP  #22 Purdue. Down 4 points with 7 seconds left, Colorado State committed a foul. In the double bonus, Purdue missed both free throws. CSU scored a three pointer with 0.7 seconds left. The ensuing Purdue inbound pass was tipped; the ball fell into the hands of Michael Moris who shot the game winning three pointer at the buzzer. The game was not televised. CSU was awarded the points and won the game by two points.
March 21, 2013, in the "Round of 64" of the NCAA tournament: Colorado State beat #9 seed Missouri 84–72 to advance to the Round of 32.
January 2, 2021, at Viejas Arena: Colorado State came back from a 26-point deficit to beat San Diego State 70–67, the largest comeback in Mountain West history. 
November 22, 2021, at Sports and Fitness Center: After trailing Northeastern by 20 points early in the second half of the 2021 Paradise Jam tournament championship game, the Rams put together a comeback and outscored the Huskies 47–17 in the final 17 minutes to win the game — and the tournament — 71–61. David Roddy, who scored 27 points — and averaged 31 points a game — was named the MVP of the tournament.

Rivalries
Within the Mountain West Conference, Colorado State has notable rivalries with these schools:
Air Force: Colorado State has an in-state rivalry with the Falcons of the United States Air Force Academy in Colorado Springs. As of the 2019–20 season, Colorado State leads the series 81–32.
Utah State: Colorado State and the Aggies of Utah State University were rivals in the Mountain States Conference from the 1939–40 to 1961–62 seasons. Beginning in the 2013–14 season, the two schools again competed in the same conference, the Mountain West. Utah State has a 46–35 lead in the series as of the 2013–14 season. However, in between those years, the two schools continued to play each other regularly.
Wyoming: In a rivalry dubbed the "Border War", the Cowboys of the University of Wyoming have a 136–101 series lead over Colorado State as of the conclusion of the 2021 conference regular season.

Outside the MW, these are noted rivalries:
Colorado: This in-state basketball rivalry pits Colorado State against Colorado, a member of the Pac-12 Conference. As of 2021, Colorado leads the series 92–40.
Denver: Also in-state, this rivalry is against the Pioneers of the University of Denver, a member of The Summit League. Colorado State leads the all-time series 92–68 as of 2013.
Northern Colorado: This rivalry pits Colorado State against the Bears of the University of Northern Colorado, a member of the Big Sky Conference in Greeley, another city in the Northern Colorado region. Colorado State leads the series 66–35 as of 2014–15, and the two schools have played each other annually since the 2003–04 season.

References

External links
 

 
1901 establishments in Colorado